Crawfordsville station is an Amtrak intercity rail station in Crawfordsville, Indiana, served by the Cardinal.

History
The original station was built in 1926 by the Monon Railroad, which it served until September 30, 1967.

The depot was purchased by Nancy Morris from CSX and renovated in 2004 into a physical therapy clinic and a banquet room. Amtrak currently uses a shelter station immediately adjacent to the original depot.

Renovation
The shelter station was in poor condition in 2005 when seniors at Crawfordsville Senior High School began renovating it in a project which soon attracted national attention.  They applied for grants and obtained material from local merchants. Trains Magazine reported that the students painted the station, reglazed the windows, repaired the ventilation system and lighting, and planted a flower garden outside,  removing 60 bags of trash. The refurbished station had a grand reopening the following May.

In recognition of their efforts, Amtrak gave its "Champions of the Rails" award to the Crawfordsville High School class of 2006. The students spoke to Amtrak officials in Chicago and also travelled to Washington, D.C., to address members of the National Association of Railroad Passengers and of the United States Congress.

References

External links

Crawfordsville Amtrak Station (USA Rail Guide -- Train Web)
Amtrak Photo Archive

Amtrak stations in Indiana
Former Monon Railroad stations
Transportation buildings and structures in Montgomery County, Indiana
1926 establishments in Indiana
1967 disestablishments in Indiana
Railway stations in the United States opened in 1926
Crawfordsville, Indiana